Yelena Korolyova (born 27 October 1973) is a Russian freestyle skier. She competed at the 1992 Winter Olympics, the 1994 Winter Olympics, and the 1998 Winter Olympics.

References

1973 births
Living people
Russian female freestyle skiers
Olympic freestyle skiers of the Unified Team
Olympic freestyle skiers of Russia
Freestyle skiers at the 1992 Winter Olympics
Freestyle skiers at the 1994 Winter Olympics
Freestyle skiers at the 1998 Winter Olympics
Sportspeople from Ufa
20th-century Russian women
21st-century Russian women